Nikola Prebiračević (born 23 January 1986) is a Serbian footballer who plays for FK Leotar.

Club career
He began his career at his hometown club Red Star Belgrade (1999-2006), where he spent 7 years of his life. Prebiračević also spent time on loan at FK Bečej (2006).

After FK Bečej he went to FK Hajduk Beograd in the 2nd League of Serbia where he spent two years (2007-2009). He also spent 6 months playing in the youth team of AFC Ajax.

Then he signed a professional contract with FK Mladi Radnik from Požarevac (Serbian SuperLiga, 2009-2010). After 1 year he moved to FK Javor Ivanjica (Serbian SuperLiga, 2010-2011). Prebiračević played half a season for FK Drina Zvornik (Boanian Premier League, 2011)  before suffering an injury which ended his season.

Prebiračević recovered from injury and signed for OPS in Finland for the 2012 season. After Finland OPS he went to FK Leotar playing in the Premier League of Bosnia and Herzegovina 2013-14 season. He returned to the club for the 2019-20 season.

References

1986 births
Living people
Serbian footballers
Serbian expatriate footballers
Association football defenders
OFK Bečej 1918 players
FK Hajduk Beograd players
FK Mladi Radnik players
FK Javor Ivanjica players
FK Drina Zvornik players
FK Leotar players
Oulun Palloseura players
FC Ararat Yerevan players
FK Sūduva Marijampolė players
FK Utenis Utena players
FK Dečić players
Premier League of Bosnia and Herzegovina players
Montenegrin First League players
A Lyga players
Armenian Premier League players
Ykkönen players
Serbian SuperLiga players
Serbian expatriate sportspeople in Bosnia and Herzegovina
Serbian expatriate sportspeople in Finland
Serbian expatriate sportspeople in Armenia
Serbian expatriate sportspeople in Lithuania
Serbian expatriate sportspeople in Montenegro
Expatriate footballers in Bosnia and Herzegovina
Expatriate footballers in Finland
Expatriate footballers in Armenia
Expatriate footballers in Lithuania
Expatriate footballers in Montenegro